The Kensington Vipers are a Canadian Junior ice hockey club from Kensington, Prince Edward Island.  They are members of the Island Junior Hockey League and are 2011 and 2013 Don Johnson Memorial Cup Atlantic Junior B champions.

Team history
The Kensington Vipers joined the Island Junior Hockey League in 1998 after the Kensington Granites Senior hockey team had folded and the Community Gardens arena was looking for a junior hockey client.

After sponsorship stints as "Don Clark Insurance" and "Valley Truss and Metal", a full-time sponsor was found in 2003, as Moase Plumbing and Heating assumed sponsorship.

After many underachieving years, the Vipers reached the Island Championship in 2002 but lost in the seventh game to the now defunct O'Leary Eagles.  The following season, the team also lost in seven games at the finals but this time to the Sherwood Falcons.

Through the 2003–2004 season the Vipers were amongst the top of the league and remained on top through the end of the regular season and were favoured to win the PEI title.  After a quick dismissal of the now relocated Evangeline Loggers of Wellington, the Vipers met their longtime rivals in the Sherwood Falcons. The Vipers won their first championship in five games on home ice before a sellout crowd, with arguably the best team they had put forth in franchise history, which included key defence Joey Wood, Matt Ramsay and Travis Gallant, forward Mitchell Jollimore, Robbie Doiron and Tim MacDougall as well as all-star goaltender Dan Corriveau.

The following season, the Vipers continued on their domination atop the Island Junior Hockey League. Kirk MacPhee had proven himself as the league's top playmaker, and former Summerside Capital Brad Doiron was added to the lineup. After gaining home ice advantage through their play in the regular season, the Vipers dismissed their opening round opponent, the Summerside Red Wings, and once again met the Falcons in the Final. After being down 3–2 in games of the best of seven, the Vipers won two in a row to defend their title in which will go down as perhaps the best IJHL final to date.

The following year the Vipers tried to go for a three peat, though they did not finish first overall in the regular season.  This would prove to be a difference in the island final, as the Vipers lost the finals to Sherwood in six games and on home ice.

2011 Don Johnson Cup
After multiple previous missed chances at the Maritime Junior B championship, the Vipers were not to be denied in 2011.  Hosted by their rivals, the Montague Maniacs, the Vipers dropped their first game to them 3–2 in an overtime shootout.  The IJHL champions then took on the St. John's Junior Hockey League's St. John's Jr. Celtics and beat them 9–4.  The next day, the Vipers took on the New Brunswick Junior B Hockey League's Tri-County River Cats and beat them 4–1.  On the final day of the round robin, the Vipers defeated the Nova Scotia Junior Hockey League's Bay Ducks to clinch second place with a 3-0-1 record and a spot in the semi-final.  On April 30, the Vipers played the Ducks for the second time in two days, this time the Vipers won 4–3 in double overtime.  On May 1, the Vipers got their rematch against the Maniacs in an All-PEI final.  The Vipers won 3–0 to win their first Maritime Championship and the first PEI title since 2002.

All Time Leader Points
The Kensington Vipers all time point leaders are Blake Gallant and Brett (Duck) MacDonald

Season-by-season record

Don Johnson Memorial Cup
Eastern Canada Jr B Championships

External links
IJHL Website

Ice hockey teams in Prince Edward Island
Ice hockey clubs established in 1998
1998 establishments in Prince Edward Island